Gjessing is a Danish and Norwegian surname. Notable people with the surname include:
Alf Gjessing
Gustav Antonio Gjessing (1835–1921), Norwegian philologist
Gutorm Gjessing
Helge Gjessing
Just Gjessing
Ketil Gjessing (born 1934), Norwegian poet
Kristian Gjessing (born 1978), Danish handball player
Poul Ib Gjessing
Søren Christian Gjessing

Danish-language surnames
Norwegian-language surnames